Santos Futebol Clube de Angola is an Angolan football club based in Viana. They play their home games at the Estádio dos Coqueiros and Estádio da Cidadela.

In 2014, the club's management announced that they would no longer maintain a men's senior category and instead focus on under-age categories seeking to achieve a strong team to compete at the Girabola in the near future.

Achievements
Angola Cup: 1 
 2008
Angola Super Cup: 1 
 2009

Performance in CAF competitions
CAF Confederation Cup: 1 appearance
2009 – Group Stage

League & Cup Positions

Manager history and performance

Players

See also
 Girabola
 2013 Girabola
 Gira Angola

References

External links
  Official club website
 2013 squad at Girabola.com
 2012 squad at Girabola.com

Football clubs in Angola
Football clubs in Luanda
Association football clubs established in 2002
2002 establishments in Angola
Sports clubs in Angola